Hicham Acheffay (born 10 August 2000) is a Dutch professional footballer who plays as a forward for Eerste Divisie club PEC Zwolle.

Career

Early career
Growing up in Amsterdam-Oost, Acheffay played youth football for Zeeburgia, Ajax, Zeeburgia again, FC Volendam and Vitesse. From 2017 to 2019, he was part of Jong Vitesse, the second team of the Vitesse. In the 2016–17 season, he suffered relegation with the team from the Tweede Divisie to the Derde Divisie, only to win promotion as champions again the following season. 

After the 2018–19 season, Jong Vitesse withdrew from the league system and in the summer of 2019, free agent Acheffay signed with Jong FC Utrecht on a deal until July 2022, with an option for an extra year. He made his professional debut with the second team 10 August 2019 in a 0–2 loss in the Eerste Divisie against Excelsior. He came on as a substitute for Eros Maddy in the 77th minute.

Grasshoppers
On 20 January 2021, Acheffay signed a one-and-a-half-year contract with Grasshoppers, the most successful club in Swiss football history who had suffered relegated to the second-tier Challenge League in 2019. Although he became part of the title-winning team, his contribution on the pitch was very limited with two short substitutions. Acheffay's contract was terminated prematurely and he appeared at a trial with VVV-Venlo on 28 June 2021 at VVV-Venlo, but this did not result in a permanent deal.

De Graafschap
In July 2021, Acheffay signed a two-year contract with an option for an additional year with De Graafschap. He made his debut on 7 August in a 3–0 home loss to Roda JC Kerkrade, coming on as a substitute for Giovanni Korte in the 72nd minute. Mostly coming on from the bench during the start of the season, Acheffay quickly developed into a starter during the fall of the 2021–22 season.

Acheffay scored his first goal for De Graafschap on 28 October 2022, slotting home a pass from Siem de Jong through the legs of goalkeeper Thijs Jansen to secure a 2–0 home victory.

On 20 January 2023, Acheffay's contract with De Graafschap was dissolved by mutual consent.

PEC Zwolle
On 26 January 2023, Acheffay joined PEC Zwolle until the end of the 2022–23 season.

Career statistics

Honours
Jong Vitesse
 Derde Divisie – Sunday: 2017–18

Grasshoppers
 Swiss Challenge League: 2020–21

References

External links

2000 births
Living people
Footballers from Amsterdam
Dutch sportspeople of Moroccan descent
Dutch footballers
Association football forwards
A.V.V. Zeeburgia players
AFC Ajax players
FC Volendam players
SBV Vitesse players
FC Utrecht players
Jong FC Utrecht players
Grasshopper Club Zürich players
De Graafschap players
PEC Zwolle players
Tweede Divisie players
Eerste Divisie players
Swiss Challenge League players
Dutch expatriate footballers
Expatriate footballers in Switzerland
Dutch expatriate sportspeople in Switzerland